On 20 February 1987, Arunachal Pradesh became a full fledged state of India.

The key political players in Arunachal Pradesh state in north-east India are the ruling Bharatiya Janata Party, Indian National Congress, Janata Dal (United) and People's Party of Arunachal.

National politics
There are only two Lok Sabha (lower house of the Indian Parliament) constituencies in Arunachal Pradesh.

State politics
The Arunachal Pradesh Legislative Assembly has 60 seats directly elected from single-seat constituencies.

Political parties
Major National Parties
 Indian National Congress (INC) Found in 1885 
 Bharatiya Janata Party (BJP) Found in 1984

Minor National-level Parties
 National People's Party (NPP)
 Nationalist Congress Party (NCP)
 All India Trinamool Congress (AITC)
 Janata Dal (United) (JDU)
 Janata Dal (Secular) (JDS)

Regional Parties
 People's Party of Arunachal (PPA)

Defunct Political Parties
 Arunachal Congress (AC) {merged with Congress}
 Arunachal Congress (Mithi) (AC(M)) {merged with Congress}
 Congress (Dolo) {merged with BJP}

See also
 Arunachal Pradesh Legislative Assembly

References